Jim Wallace (born 9 June 1954) is a Scottish former professional footballer who played as a left back.

Career
Born in Stirling, Wallace played for Dunfermline Athletic, Aldershot and Alloa Athletic.

References

1954 births
Living people
Scottish footballers
Dunfermline Athletic F.C. players
Aldershot F.C. players
Alloa Athletic F.C. players
Scottish Football League players
English Football League players
Association football fullbacks
Scotland under-23 international footballers
Scottish Football League representative players